The 1996 Coupe de France Final was a football match held at the Parc des Princes in Paris on 4 May 1996, that saw Auxerre defeat Nîmes 2–1 thanks to goals by Laurent Blanc and Lilian Laslandes.

Match details

See also
1995–96 Coupe de France

External links
Coupe de France results at Rec.Sport.Soccer Statistics Foundation
Report on French federation site

Coupe
1996
Coupe De France Final 1996
Coupe De France Final 1996
Coupe de France Final
Coupe de France Final